Ibrahim Namo Ibrahim (born October 1, 1937) is a bishop of the Catholic Church in the United States.  He served as the Apostolic Exarch of United States of America from 1982 to 1985, and then, following its elevation, as the first eparch (bishop) of the Chaldean Catholic Eparchy of Saint Thomas the Apostle of Detroit, from 1985 until his retirement in 2014. Bishop Francis Y. Kalabat was named to succeed him as Eparch.

Biography
Born in Tel Keppe, Iraq to a Chaldo-Assyrian family in 1937, Ibrahim was later ordained a priest on December 30, 1962.

Ibrahim travelled to Rome in 1972 for Rome to study at the Pontifical University of St. Thomas Aquinas Angelicum earning a doctorate in theology in 1975.

Pope John Paul II named him as the Titular Bishop of Anbar dei Caldei and Apostolic Exarch of the United States of America on January 11, 1982. He was ordained a bishop by Patriarch Paul II Cheikho of the Chaldean Catholic Church on March 7, 1982.  The principal co-consecrators were Archbishops Emmanuel-Karim Delly, Curial Bishop of Babylon, George Garmo of Mosul, Stéphane Babaca of Arbil, Stéphane Katchou of Basra, and Bishops Abdul-Ahad Sana of Alquoch and Abdul-Ahad Rabban, O.A.O.C. of Aqrā.  On August 3, 1985 Pope John Paul II elevated the Apostolic Exarchate to an Eparchy and Ibrahim was named its first bishop.

See also
 

 Catholic Church hierarchy
 Catholic Church in the United States
 Historical list of the Catholic bishops of the United States
 List of Catholic bishops of the United States
 Lists of patriarchs, archbishops, and bishops

References

External links 
 Chaldean Catholic Eparchy of Detroit Official Site

Episcopal succession

1937 births
Living people
People from Tel Keppe
Iraqi Assyrian people
Iraqi Eastern Catholics
Iraqi emigrants to the United States
Chaldean bishops
20th-century Eastern Catholic bishops
21st-century Eastern Catholic bishops
American Eastern Catholic bishops
20th-century American clergy
21st-century American clergy